The Shchuchy Range, is a range of mountains in Chukotka Autonomous Okrug, Russian Far East. Administratively the range is part of the Anadyr District. 

Geography
To the west the mountain range is limited by the course of the Anadyr River, which flows first southwards, then makes a wide bend at the southern end of the range, and then flows roughly northeastwards in a wide valley. Numerous tributaries of the Anadyr have their source on both sides of the range. 

To the northwest of the range rises the Anyuy Range, stretching in a roughly western direction, and to the west of the SW end of the range rises the Oloy Range of the Kolyma Mountains. The Shchuchy Range is part of the East Siberian System of mountains and is one of the subranges of the Anadyr Highlands.

See also
List of mountains and hills of Russia

References

External links
O.Yu.Glushkova, Late Pleistocene Glaciations in North-East Asia

Mountain ranges of Russia
Mountain ranges of Chukotka Autonomous Okrug
Landforms of Siberia